The 2019–20 season was Brighton & Hove Albion's 118th year in existence and third consecutive season in the Premier League. Along with competing in the Premier League, the club also participated in the FA Cup and EFL Cup. The season covered the period from 1 July 2019 to 26 July 2020.

On 14 March 2020, The FA made the decision to suspend the season due to the COVID-19 pandemic. The season recommenced on 17 June, with Brighton's fixture against Arsenal rescheduled for the 20 June.

Summary 
On the back of four wins in five matches in pre-season, Brighton began their league campaign with a 3–0 away win over Watford, which was Potter's first competitive game in charge of the club. The Seagulls drew 1–1 with West Ham in their first competitive home game of the season. Brighton's first defeat came in the third game of the season in a 2–0 home loss to Southampton where Florin Andone was sent off for a wild challenge on Yan Valery. On 5 October, Brighton stunned Tottenham Hotspur by beating them 3–0 at Falmer Stadium with Aaron Connolly scoring 2 goals in his first ever Premier League start.

Brighton's first cup game came away against Bristol Rovers where the Seagulls won 2–1 in the EFL Cup. They were knocked out in the next round on 25 September, losing 3–1 at home to Aston Villa where 10 Albion players made their debut in the youthful side of an average age of just over 21.

After reaching the quarter final and the semi final of the FA Cup in the previous two seasons Brighton were knocked out in their first match (third round) of this season's competition to Sheffield Wednesday, losing 1–0 at home.

Brighton's goalless draw at Wolves on 7 March 2020 was their last until 20 June due to the COVID-19 pandemic. The Seagulls first game back came against Arsenal at home on 20 June 2020, where they achieved their first ever double over the London side, winning the match 2–1. This, like the rest of the upcoming matches was played behind closed doors.

Brighton secured their Premier League status on 20 July in a 0–0 home draw against Newcastle, earning a 4th consecutive season in the top flight. The Seagulls beat Burnley 2–1 on the final game of the season finishing the season with 41 points, their highest tally in a Premier League season, also finishing with their highest amount of goals scored (39) and their joint highest finish (15th).

Players

Squad

 
 (Captain)

 (Vice-captain)

Out on loan

 

Note

All loan spells, except Percy Tau's loan at Club Brugge extended to the end of each respective league season due to the breaks enforced as a result of COVID-19.
Tau returned to Brighton on 30 June 2020 as Club Brugge were announced as the Belgium champions in May, with the league permanently suspended with one remaining match.

Fulham took up their option to buy Anthony Knockaert on 9 July 2020.

Reserves and Academy

Transfers

Transfers in

Loans in

Loans out

Transfers out

Pre-season friendlies
In June 2019, The Seagulls confirmed their pre-season schedule.

Competitions

Premier League

League table

Results summary

Results by matchday

Matches
On 13 June 2019, the Premier League fixtures were announced.

FA Cup

The third round draw was made live on BBC Two from Etihad Stadium, Micah Richards and Tony Adams conducted the draw.

EFL Cup

Squad statistics

|-
! colspan=14 style=background:#dcdcdc; text-align:center|Goalkeepers

                                                                                                                                             

|-
! colspan=14 style=background:#dcdcdc; text-align:center|Defenders

 
     
|-
! colspan=14 style=background:#dcdcdc; text-align:center|Midfielders
                     

|-
! colspan=14 style=background:#dcdcdc; text-align:center|Forwards
 

 
                                    
|-
! colspan=14 style=background:#dcdcdc; text-align:center| Players who left the club permanently or on loan during the season

|-
|}

References

Brighton & Hove Albion F.C. seasons
Brighton and Hove Albion F.C.